Tone Irén Liljeroth (born 19 March 1975) is a Norwegian politician for the Progress Party.

She served as a deputy representative to the Parliament of Norway from Akershus during the term 2009–2013. She is also a member of Skedsmo municipal council.

References

1975 births
Living people
People from Skedsmo
Deputy members of the Storting
Progress Party (Norway) politicians
Akershus politicians
Women members of the Storting